Indian Lake State Park is a public recreation area covering  in    
Schoolcraft County on the Upper Peninsula of Michigan. The state park is made up of two units that are three miles apart, one on the south shore of Indian Lake, one on the west shore.

History
Acquisition of the south shore site occurred in 1932; acquisition of the west shore site occurred in 1939, with development beginning there in 1965. Members of the Civilian Conservation Corps and WPA developed the south shore site in the 1930s, building a log bath house and a 40-by-80-foot limestone picnic shelter that is still in use.

Activities and amenities
The park offers swimming, boating, hiking, picnicking, and camping.

References

External links

Indian Lake State Park Michigan Department of Natural Resources
Indian Lake State Park Map Michigan Department of Natural Resources

State parks of Michigan
Protected areas of Schoolcraft County, Michigan
Protected areas established in 1932
1932 establishments in Michigan
Civilian Conservation Corps in Michigan